Nicky Love is a singer and model. She began her modelling career at the age of 14. She was a member of Freaked Out Flower Children, a band which released an album Love In (1990) that included the single "Spill the Wine" which reached No.31 on the Australian singles charts. She released a solo album Honeyvision in 2001. She has appeared on TV on Countdown Revolution, Entertainment News Show, G.P. and E Street.

Discography
Honeyvision (2001) – DreamWorks

References
Australian Playboy, July 1992
Vanity Fair – March 2001
Details – January/February 2001
Marbella Magazine – July 2000

Australian female models
Australian women singers
Australian songwriters
Living people
Year of birth missing (living people)